Liu Li (born 3 April 1997) is a Chinese footballer currently playing as a midfielder for Shandong Taishan.

Career statistics

Club
.

References

1997 births
Living people
Chinese footballers
Association football midfielders
China League Two players
Shandong Taishan F.C. players
Sichuan Jiuniu F.C. players